Mar Denha I (also written Dinkha I) was Patriarch of the Church of the East (sometimes referred to as the Nestorian church) from 1265 to 1281.  He was widely suspected of murdering Shem'on Bar Qaligh, bishop of Tus, and was remembered by later generations as Denha Qatola, 'Denha the Murderer'.

Patriarchate 
In 1268 the Patriarch had moved from Baghdad, first to Oshnou in Azerbaijan and later to Urmia and Maragheh. 

Denha I was patriarch when Rabban Bar Sauma and his companion Rabban Markos arrived in Persia, on their pilgrimage from China towards Jerusalem. Denha had his seat in Baghdad at that time, and requested the two monks to visit the court of Abaqa in order to obtain confirmation letters for Mar Denha's ordination as Patriarch. Intending to establish them as leaders of the Church of the East in China, Denha consecrated Markos as Mar Yahballaha, Bishop of Katai and Ong, and named Rabban Bar Sauma vicar general. Later, Denha charged the monks to return to China as his messengers.  However, their departure was delayed due to armed conflict along the route.  When Denha died, Markos was elected as his successor.

A modern assessment of Denha's reign can be found in David Wilmshurst's The Martyred Church.

Notes

References
James A. Montgomery, History of Yaballaha III, (New York:  Columbia University Press, 1927).
E. A. Wallis Budge, The Monks of Kublai Khan, (London:  Religious Tract Society, 1928).
 
 Paul Bedjan, Histoire de Mar Jab-Alaha, Patriarche, (1888, 2nd ed 1995; reprint Gorgias, 2007). Syriac text on which the translations of Montgomery and Budge are based.
Gregory Barhebraeus, Chronicon Ecclesiasticum, ed. J. B. Abbeloos and T. J. Lamy, (Paris:  Maisonneuve, 1877), 3: II, cols.451ff.
Wilmshurst, David, The Martyred Church: A History of the Church of the East (London, 2011).

External links
 Chaldeans, History and Cultural Relations

Patriarchs of the Church of the East
Year of birth missing
1281 deaths
13th-century bishops of the Church of the East